Depressaria basicostata is a moth of the family Depressariidae. It is found in Japan.

References

Moths described in 1931
Depressaria
Moths of Japan